Prince Jerzy Konstanty Czartoryski (1828–1912) was a Polish noble (szlachcic) and politician.

Jerzy was married to Marie Čermáková, married on 2 May 1861 in Vienna; his brother-in-law was the painter Jaroslav Čermák.

References

1828 births
1912 deaths
Politicians from Dresden
People from the Kingdom of Saxony
Jerzy Konstanty Czartoryski
Polish Austro-Hungarians
Members of the Austrian House of Deputies (1873–1879)
Members of the Austrian House of Deputies (1879–1885)
Members of the Austrian House of Deputies (1885–1891)
Members of the Austrian House of Deputies (1891–1897)
Members of the House of Lords (Austria)
Members of the Diet of Galicia and Lodomeria